Hans Jakob Skaar Pedersen (30 December 1908 – 30 March 1946) was a Norwegian police official and member of Nasjonal Samling who was sentenced to death for treason and executed in 1946.

He was born in Stavanger to pharmacist Henrik Bernhard Pedersen and Tyri Josefine Pedersen. He graduated as a jurist in 1941 and was first assigned a position in Torridal. In January 1942 he was appointed acting district sheriff in Avaldsnes and mayor of Kopervik and Stangaland. In 1943 he was appointed as a police officer for  the Statspolitiet (State Police, STAPO) in Stavanger, and was eventually promoted police chief of the Stavanger district, which included Aust-Agder, Vest-Agder, Rogaland, and parts of Hordaland. 

In the legal purge he was tried for threats against prominent citizens (including priests and barristers), and several incidents of torture and maltreatment. Pedersen was sentenced to death by the Supreme Court of Norway in March 1946, and executed by firing squad at Sverresborg, Bergen, on 30 March.

References

1908 births
1946 deaths
People from Stavanger
Norwegian police chiefs
Members of Nasjonal Samling
Executed Norwegian collaborators with Nazi Germany